Blood in the Gears is the fourth album from American Christian metal band The Showdown. It's their second album with Solid State Records. Released on August 24, 2010, the album was recorded at Anthem Productions in Nashville, Tennessee, and produced by the band's bassist, Jeremiah Scott.

The title track was released as a single.

Reception
PopMatters reviewer Chris Colgan called the album "a pinnacle in The Showdown's career because they have both cemented their sound and managed to experiment with new ideas and influences at the same time". Jesusfreakhideout.com gave it three and a half stars, with Timothy Estabrooks calling it "an album with the occasional high point, but not enough consistency to be memorable".

Charts
The album peaked at number 21 on Billboards 'Top Christian Albums' chart.

Track listing

Personnel
The Showdown
 David Bunton – vocals
 Josh Childers – guitar, backing vocals, gang vocals
 Patrick Judge – guitar, backing vocals
 Jeremiah Scott – bass, backing vocals, gang vocals
 Timothy "Yogi" Watts – drums
Additional musicians
 Riley Anglen – guest backing vocals on "The Man Named Hell" & "Diggin' My Own Grave", gang vocals
 Chris Bazor – guest lead vocals on "Graveyard of Empires", gang vocals
 Cody Richardson – additional guest lead vocals, gang vocals
 Brian Shorter – gang vocals

Production
 Jon Dunn – A&R
 Invisible Creature – art direction
 Ryan Clark – design
 Steve Blackmon – mixed by 
 Jerad Knudson – photography
 Ethan Luck – photography
 Jeremiah Scott – producer, engineer, editing

References

The Showdown (band) albums
2010 albums
Solid State Records albums